2010 Italian Athletics Indoor Championships was the 41st edition of the Italian Athletics Indoor Championships and were held in Ancona.

Champions

Men

Women

See also
2010 Italian Athletics Championships

References

External links
 FIDAL web site

Italian Athletics Championships
Athletics
Italian Athletics Indoor Championships